James Duff (born September 3, 1955) is an American television writer, producer and director. He was born in New Orleans, Louisiana and has written plays and television screenplays. He is credited as the creator of the TV series The Closer and Major Crimes.

Personal life
Duff is married to actor Phillip P. Keene, who plays Buzz Watson on The Closer and Major Crimes.

Writing credits
 The Closer (Head writer/showrunner)
 The D.A.
 Enterprise
 Felicity (episode: "My Best Friend's Wedding")
 The Agency
 Wolf Lake
 Popular
 The War at Home (directed by Emilio Estevez) (based on Duff's play Homefront)
 Betrayed: A Story of Three Women (directed by William A. Graham)
 919 Fifth Avenue
 Without a Kiss Goodbye (directed by Noel Nosseck)
 A Song for You (directed by Ken Martin)
 Doing Time on Maple Drive
 Star Trek: Picard

Producing credits
 The Closer (executive producer)
 Major Crimes (executive Producer)
 The D.A. (executive producer)
 The War at Home (producer)
 Texas Graces (co-executive producer),
 Long Island Fever (co-executive producer)

Directing credits
 The Closer

Awards and  nominations
Duff was nominated for an Emmy Award for his screenplay for the television movie Doing Time on Maple Drive. He scored a single Edgar Allan Poe Awards nomination in 2007 with Mike Berchem.

References

External links

1955 births
Lamar High School (Arlington, Texas) alumni
20th-century American dramatists and playwrights
American television directors
Television producers from Texas
American television writers
American male television writers
American gay writers
Living people
American male dramatists and playwrights
20th-century American male writers
Screenwriters from Texas